The following is a list of Cypriots notable enough to have their own article.  They are sorted by field, then by surname (both in alphabetical order).

Academics and scientists 
 Kyriacos A. Athanasiou (born 1960), biomedical engineer
 Ulus Baker (1960-2007), sociologist
 Niyazi Berkes (1908-1988), sociologist
 Gülsen Bozkurt (born 1950), haematologist
 Mustafa Camgöz (born 1952), professor of cancer biology at Imperial College London
 Mehmet Çakıcı (born 1966), psychiatrist
 Anastasios Christodoulou, foundation secretary, Open University
 Andreas Demetriou, developmental psychologist
 Nicos Kartakoullis, professor at the University of Nicosia
 Niyazi Kızılyürek (born 1959), political scientist
 Kyriacos C. Markides, professor of sociology and author
 Kypros Nicolaides (born 1953), obstetrician
 Kyriacos Costa Nicolaou (born 1946), chemist
 C. L. Max Nikias (born 1952), president of the University of Southern California in Los Angeles
 Andreas G. Orphanides (born 1955), Professor and Rector
 Athanasios Orphanides (born 1962), economist
 Kamil Özerk (born 1954), pedagogue
 Irena Papadopoulos, head of transcultural studies in health at Middlesex University
 Christopher A. Pissarides (born 1948), economist, Nobel laureate
 Andreas Pitsillides, theologian
 Sophocles Sophocleous, art historian
 Symeon C. Symeonides (born 1949), dean of the Willamette University College of Law
 Andrekos Varnava (born 1979), academic, historian and author
 Marius Vassiliou (born 1957), computational physicist and research executive
 Vamık Volkan (born 1932), psychiatrist and author
 Panayiotis Zavos (born 1944), geneticist

Actors 
 Zeki Alasya, actor
 Angie Bowie, actress, personality
 Feri Cansel, erotic actress
 Natasia Demetriou, actress,  What We Do in the Shadows, Stath Lets Flats
 Hazar Ergüçlü, actress, The Wild Pear Tree, Medcezir
 Dimitri Leonidas, actor, Sinbad, Tormented
 Georgina Leonidas, actress, The Basil Brush Show, Harry Potter and the Half-Blood Prince, Harry Potter and the Deathly Hallows – Part 2
 Stephanie Leonidas, actress, Defiance, Atlantis: End of a World, Birth of a Legend
 Sotiris Moustakas (1940-2007), Greek/Cypriot comedy actor
 Ada Nicodemou (born 1977), actress, Home and Away
 Hal Ozsan, actor, Dawson's Creek, Kyle XY
 Peter Polycarpou, actor

Artists 
 Ruzen Atakan (born 1966), painter
 Helene Black, artist
 Michael Cacoyannis (1922-2011), filmmaker
 Hussein Chalayan (Hüseyin Çağlayan, born 1970), fashion designer
 Chapman Brothers (Jake born 1966, Dinos born 1962), artists
 Tracey Emin (born 1963), artist
 İsmet Güney (1932-2009), artist, creator of the flag of Cyprus, and cartoonist
 Panayiotis Kalorkoti (born 1957), artist
 Telemachos Kanthos (1910-1993), artist
 Marios Loizides, (1928-1988), artist
 Loukia Nicolaidou, artist
 Stass Paraskos (1933-2014), artist
 Aristos Petrou (born 1990), hip-hop artist
 Konstantia Sofokleous (born 1974), artist, animation
 Stelarc (born 1946), performance artist
 Derviş Zaim (born 1964), novelist and filmmaker

Business 

 Suat Günsel, billionaire
 Stelios Haji-Ioannou, entrepreneur, owner of EasyGroup
 Dakis Joannou, J&P
 Lycourgos Kyprianou, former chairman of GlobalSoft and AremisSoft Corp
 Asil Nadir, Polly Peck
 Theo Paphitis, former chairman of Millwall Football Club
 Roys Poyiadjis, former co-chief executive officer of AremisSoft
 Reo Stakis, hotel and casino owner
 Andreas Panayiotou, businessman, property developer

Historical figures 
 Acesas (around 5th century BC), ancient artist, famed weaver
 Andromachus of Cyprus, admiral of Alexander the Great 
 Grigoris Afxentiou, member of EOKA
 Altheides, philosopher
 St Barnabas (1st century), apostolic father, early missionary
 Caterina Cornaro, Queen of Cyprus
 Charlotte of Cyprus, Queen of Cyprus
 Clearchus of Soli (4th-3rd century BC), Cyprus-born Greek philosopher of the Peripatetic school
 Evagoras, king of Salamis (410-374 BC)
 Henry I of Cyprus, King of Cyprus
 Hugh I of Cyprus, King of Cyprus
 Hugh II of Cyprus, King of Cyprus
 Hugh III of Cyprus, King of Cyprus
 Hugh IV of Cyprus, King of Cyprus
 James I of Cyprus, King of Cyprus
 James II of Cyprus, King of Cyprus
 James III of Cyprus, King of Cyprus
 Janus of Cyprus, King of Cyprus
 John II of Cyprus, King of Cyprus
 Stefano Lusignan, writer
 Leontios Makhairas, historian
 Kyriakos Matsis, member of EOKA
 Nicocreon (4th century BC-before 306 BC), king of Salamis 
 Evagoras Pallikarides, member of EOKA
 Abu Bekr Pasha
 Kıbrıslı Mehmed Emin Pasha, Grand Vizier
 Kıbrıslı Mehmed Kamil Pasha (born 1883), Grand Vizier
 Persaeus of Citium (306-243 BC), Stoic philosopher
 Peter I of Cyprus, King of Cyprus
 Peter II of Cyprus, King of Cyprus
 Sergius Paulus (1st century), proconsul of Cyprus
 Stasanor (lived 4th century BC), Cyprus-born Greek officer of Alexander the Great, later satrap of Drangiana, Bactria, and Sogdiana
 Stasinus (~7th century BC), one of the first European poets, a semi-legendary early Greek poet, author of the epic poem "Cypria", related to the Trojan War
 Theodora (around 500-548), empress of Byzantine empire (527-548)
 Zeno of Citium (333-264 BC), Cyprus-born Greek philosopher, founder of Stoicism

Jurists 
 Alecos Markides
 Solon Nikitas (1937-2005), judge and jurist, Supreme Court (1988-2003), Attorney-General (2003-2005)

Musicians 
 Ivi Adamou, singer (The X Factor), represented Cyprus in the 2012 Eurovision Song Contest
 Peter Andre, singer
 Marlen Aggelidou, singer
 Lisa Andreas, singer
Aris Antoniades, composer
 Nil Burak, singer
 Konstantinos Christoforou, singer
 Kemal Cetinay, singer and TV personality
 Philippos Constantinos, singer (in One)
 Tulisa Contostavlos, singer
 Diam's, singer, rapper
 Nicolas Economou, composer
 Eleftheria Eleftheriou, singer (The X Factor), represents Greece in the 2012 Eurovision Song Contest
 Elpida, Greek singer, sang for Cyprus in the 1986 Eurovision Song Contest
 Barry Evangeli, music producer
 Evridiki, singer
 Michalis Hatzigiannis, singer
 Savvas Houvartas, guitarist, songwriter
 Alkinoos Ioannidis, singer
 Yusuf Islam, singer
 George Kallis, composer
 Fikri Karayel, singer-songwriter
 Mick Karn, musician from the rock band Japan
 Yannis Kyriakides, composer
 Andreas G. Orphanides, composer
 Cyprien Katsaris, French-Cypriot pianist
 Maria Elena Kiriakou, singer, winner of the first season of The Voice of Greece
 Stelios Konstantas, singer
 Stavros Konstantinou, singer
 George Michael, singer
 Stavros Michalakakos, singer, winner of Greece's X-Factor II
 Despina Olympiou, singer, represents Cyprus in the 2013 Eurovision Song Contest
 Alex Panayi, singer-songwriter
 Elena Patroklou, singer (Greek-Cypriot parents)
 Aristos Petrou, rapper
 Marianda Pieridi, singer
 Nikki Ponte, singer (X-Factor)
 Ziynet Sali (born 1975), singer
 Sarbel, British-born Greek singer
 Savvas Savva, composer, pianist
 Cat Stevens, British singer-songwriter and multi-instrumentalist; Cypriot father
 Rüya Taner, pianist
 Georges Theofanous, composer (Greece)
 Martino Tirimo, Cypriot pianist, born in Larnaca, Cyprus
 Marios Tokas, singer, composer
 Okan Ersan, guitarist 
 Mihalis Violaris, singer, composer
 Anna Vissi, singer
 Lia Vissi, singer (older sister of Anna Vissi)
 Loucas Yiorkas, singer, The X Factor winner 2009, represents Greece in the 2011 Eurovision Song Contest
 Andrew Lambrou, represents Cyprus in the 2023 Eurovision Song Contest

Mythical figures 
 Anaxarete, legendary Cypriot maiden in Greek mythology
 Iphis see Anaxarete
 Aphrodite, Goddess of Love
 Pygmalion, legendary king of Cyprus in Greek mythology

Political figures 

 Adamos Adamou, MEP
 Mustafa Akıncı, President of Northern Cyprus (2015–present)
 Nicos Anastasiades, President of the Republic of Cyprus (2013–present)
 Praxoula Antoniadou, Acting President of the United Democrats
 Mustafa Çağatay, Prime Minister of Northern Cyprus (1978–1983)
 Reşat Çağlar, diplomat
 Dimitris Christofias, former president of Cyprus (2008–2013)
 Kypros Chrysostomides, politician
 Katherine Clerides, former politician, peace activist
 Panayiotis Demetriou, MEP
 Rauf Denktaş, first President of Northern Cyprus
 Derviş Eroğlu, long-time prime minister and president of Northern Cyprus (2010–2015)
 Kutlay Erk, the former mayor of the Nicosia Turkish Municipality
 Alexis Galanos, Mayor of Famagusta and former president of the House of Representatives
 Marios Garoyian, President of the House of Representatives
 Polycarpos Georgadjis, politician and member of EOKA
 Takis Hadjigeorgiou, MEP
 Mehmet Harmancı, mayor of North Nicosia
 Georgios Iacovou, politician
 Androulla Kaminara (born 1957), European official and EU ambassador
 Ioannis Kasoulidis, MEP
 Glafkos Klerides, President of the Republic of Cyprus (1993–2003)
 Giannos Kranidiotis, politician
 Fazıl Küçük, first Turkish Cypriot vice president of the Republic of Cyprus
 Markos Kyprianou, former Minister of Foreign Affairs, formerly Finance Minister and former European Commissioner for Health
 Spyros Kyprianou, president (1977–1988)
 Georgios Ladas, former president of the House of Representatives
 Yiorgos Lillikas, politician
 Vassos Lyssarides, founder of EDEK and former president of the House of Representatives
 Averof Neofytou, leader of DISY (2013–present)
 Makarios III, archbishop, president (1960–1977)
 Niyazi Manyera, medical doctor, politician and the first Minister of Health of the Republic of Cyprus
 Marios Matsakis, former MEP
 Yiannakis Matsis, former MEP
 Eleni Mavrou, former Mayor of Nicosia (2006–2011)
 Alekos Michaelides, former Foreign Minister and President of the House of Representatives
 Andreas Moleskis, senior civil servant
 Özkan Murat, politician
 Osman Örek, Prime Minister of Northern Cyprus (1978)
 Kudret Özersay, politician, first leader of #Toparlanıyoruz Movement and founder of Halkın Partisi
 Hüseyin Özgürgün, Prime Minister of Northern Cyprus
 Canan Öztoprak, politician
 Leonidas Pantelides, former Ambassador of Cyprus to Russia
 Tassos Papadopoulos, president (2003–2008)
 Ezekias Papaioannou, Secretary General of AKEL (1949–1988)
 Michalis Papapetrou, politician and diplomat
 Nikos Sampson, de facto president of the Cyprus Republic after the 1974 coup d'état
 Benon Sevan, ex-head of UN Oil for Food program
 Ploutis Servas, first Secretary General of AKEL
 Ferdi Sabit Soyer, politician
 Sibel Siber, first female prime minister of Northern Cyprus
 Kostas Themistocleous, politician
 Kyriacos Triantaphyllides, MEP
 Alparslan Türkeş, leading Turkish politician
 Salih Usar, Minister of Public Works and Communications
 Eşref Vaiz, politician
 Androulla Vasiliou, European Commissioner for Education, Culture, Multilingualism and Youth
 George Vasiliou, president and founder of Cypriot United Democrats party (1988–1993)

Religious figures 
 Arkadios II, Archbishop (630s–643)
 Archbishop Chrysostomos I of Cyprus, Archbishop (1977–2006)
 Archbishop Chrysostomos II of Cyprus, Archbishop (2006–)
 Barnabas, prominent early Christian disciple. He is traditionally identified as the founder of the Cypriot Orthodox Church. The feast day of Barnabas is celebrated on June 11.
 Epiphanius of Salamis, Metropolitan of Cyprus (367–403)
 Gregory II (1241–1290), Patriarch of Constantinople (1283–1289)
 John the Merciful (7th century), Patriarch of Alexandria
 Kyprianos, Archbishop (1810–1821)
 Kyrillos II, Archbishop (1909–1916)
 Kyrillos III, Archbishop (1916–1933)
 Leontios of Neapolis (7th century), Bishop of Neapolis and writer
 Lazarus of Bethany, ordained by Paul and Barnabus as the first Bishop of Kition following his resurrection
 Makarios I, Archbishop of Cyprus (1854–1865)
 Makarios II, Archbishop (1947–1950)
 Makarios III, Archbishop, president (1960–1977)
 Nazim al-Qubrusi, leader of the Naqshbandi-Haqqani Sufi Order
 Peter VII (1949–2004), Pope and Patriarch of Alexandria and All Africa (1997–2004)
 Saint Spyridon (ca. 270–348)

Sports 
 Georgios Achilleos, world champion skeet shooter
 Mete Adanır, footballer
 Efstathios Aloneftis, football player with APOEL F.C./Cyprus national football team
 Anastasios Andreou, 1896 Olympian
 Antonakis Andreou, skeet shooter
 Eleni Artymata, track and field
 Marcos Baghdatis, tennis player
 Demetri Catrakilis, rugby player for Harlequins
 Constantinos Charalambidis, football player with Apoel Nicosia
 Dimitris Christofi, football player with Omonoia Nicosia
 Christodoulos Christodoulides, judoka
 Andrew Demetriou, Australian rules football player, CEO of the Australian Football League (AFL)
 Chris Dicomidis, Cypriot national rugby team
 Tio Ellinas, race car driver
 Savva Georgiou, football player
 Marios Hadjiandreou, triple jumper
 Oscar Heidenstam, bodybuilding champion
 Marcus Holden, Cypriot national rugby team
 Lazaros Iakovou, football player
 Andreas Ioannides, football player
 Kyriakos Ioannou, track and field
 Sotiris Kaiafas, former football player with Omonoia Nicosia and Golden Boot winner
 Prodromos Katsantonis, sprinter
 Michalis Konstantinou, football player with Omonoia Nicosia
 Pavlos Kontides, first Cypriot Olympic medalist
 Anthony Koutoufides, Australian rules footballer
 Stylianos Kyriakides, marathon runner
 Tom Loizides, Cypriot national rugby team
 Anninos Marcoullides, sprinter
 Elena Mousikou, archer
 Yılmaz Orhan, football player
 Dimitri Petrides, Latin American dance pioneer
 Costas Philippou, UFC fighter/ Boxer
 Meliz Redif, athlete
 Panagiotis Sierepeklis, volleyball player
 Andreas Sofokleous, footballer
 Andreas Tsiatinis, basketball player
 Garo Yepremian, former place kicker for the Miami Dolphins
 Karolina Pelendritou, golden para Olympics winner

Writers 
 Kutlu Adali, journalist
 Ulus Baker, non-fiction writer
 Urkiye Mine Balman, poet
 Neriman Cahit, poet and author
 Kaytazzade Mehmet Nazım, poet
 Kyriakos Charalambides, poet
 Demetris Th. Gotsis, poet and writer
 Dimitris Lipertis, poet
 Peter Lyssiotis, writer
 Niki Marangou, writer
 Pembe Marmara, poet
 Vasilis Michaelides, poet
 Nicos Nicolaides, writer and painter
 Michael Paraskos, novelist and art critic
 George Philippou Pierides, writer
 Michael Theodoulou, journalist
 Osman Türkay, poet and Nobel Prize for Literature nominee
 Sevgül Uludağ, journalist
 Mehmet Yaşın, poet
 Neşe Yaşın, poet
 Özker Yaşın, poet

See also
 Culture of Cyprus
 Demographics of Cyprus

References